Protium correae is a species of plant in the Burseraceae family. It is found in Colombia, Costa Rica, Nicaragua, and Panama. It is threatened by habitat loss.

References

correae
Vulnerable plants
Taxonomy articles created by Polbot